Kershopefoot is a small hamlet in Cumbria, England, traditionally in Cumberland. It is located very close to the Scotland-England border and is near the Kershope Burn and the Liddel Water. Kershopefoot is most well known for its lodge house (Kershope Lodge) situated almost a mile from the hamlet. Between 1862 and 1969 a passenger station on the Waverley Line variously known as Kershope or Kershope Foot was located here.

References

External links

Hamlets in Cumbria
City of Carlisle